Daudi Okello (born 20 September 1995) is a Ugandan volleyball player who has played in Bulgaria, Turkey, South Korea and Indonesia. 

He currently plays for Suwon KEPCO Vixtorm in the Korean V-League.

References

External links

  at Volleybox
 

1995 births
Living people
Ugandan people